Bennettazhia is a genus of tapejaromorph pterosaur from the Early Cretaceous period of what is now the Hudspeth Formation of the state of Oregon in the United States. Although originally identified as a species of the pteranodontoid pterosaur Pteranodon, Bennettazhia is now thought to have been a different animal. The type and only species is B. oregonensis.

Discovery and history
In 1928, Charles Gilmore named a new species of Pteranodon: P. oregonensis. A humerus (holotype MPUC V.126713), two fused dorsal vertebrae and the broken-off end of some joint bone had been unearthed from the Lower Cretaceous (Albian stage) beds of the Hudspeth Formation in Wheeler County, in the state of Oregon, United States, to which the specific epithet refers. Gilmore noted similarities to Nyctosaurus though the specimens were larger.

In 1989, S. Christopher Bennett concluded that the remains might be those of a member of the Azhdarchidae instead of a pteranodontid. Russian paleontologist Lev Nesov therefore in 1991 named a new azhdarchid genus: Bennettazhia. The genus name honors Bennett and combines his name with Persian azhdarha, "dragon", a reference to Azhdarcho, the type genus of the Azhdarchidae. Bennett himself in 1994 changed his opinion and stated that it belonged to the Dsungaripteridae. Wellnhofer (1991), Peters (1997), Kellner (2003) and Unwin (2003) left it as belonging to the Pterodactyloidea incertae sedis.

Description
In 2007, American biologist Michael Habib revealed the result of a study by CAT-scan of the type specimen of Bennettazhia. Apart from the thin bone wall, the humerus was filled with a spongy tissue consisting of trabeculae, very thin bone layers and struts, forming a light yet strong construction. Habib inferred that such strength would have allowed even very large pterosaurs to launch themselves from the ground using their forelimbs. The same investigation made a better classification possible. The humerus has an elongated deltopectoral crest that is unwarped. Both dsungaripterids and azhdarchoids show this feature, but only the latter group is typified by such a very thin outer bone wall. Habib concluded that Bennettazhia was a member of the Azhdarchoidea, a more encompassing group than the Azhdarchidae.

Classification
The cladogram below follows a 2014 phylogenetic analysis by Brian Andres and colleagues. In the analysis, they placed Bennettazhia within the clade Tapejaromorpha, as the basalmost member.

See also
 Timeline of pterosaur research
 List of pterosaurs

References

Gilmore C. W. (1928), "A new Pterosaurian reptile from the marine Cretaceous of Oregon", Proc. U. S. Nat. Mus. 73, art. 24, 1–5
Bennett S. C. 1989, "Pathologies of the large pterodactyloid pterosaurs Ornithocheirus and Pteranodon", Journal of Vertebrate Paleontology, 9: 13A
Nesov, L. A. (1991), "Gigantskiye lyetayushchiye yashchyeryi semyeistva Azhdarchidae. I. Morfologiya, sistematika", Vestnik Leningradskogo Universiteta, Seriya. 7; Geologiya, Geografiya (2), 14–23
Bennett S. C. (1994), "Taxonomy and systematics of the Late Cretaceous pterosaur Pteranodon (Pterosauria, Pterodactyloidea)", Occ. Pap. Nat. Hist. Mus. Univ. Kansas 169
Michael Habib (2007), "Structural characteristics of the humerus of Bennettazhia oregonensis and their implications for specimen diagnosis and azhdarchoid biomechanics", p. 16 in: Flugsaurier: The Wellnhofer pterosaur meeting, Bavarian State Collection for Palaeontology, Munich 2007, [Abstract]

External links
 The Pterosaur Database (pdf)

Early Cretaceous pterosaurs of North America
Tapejaromorphs
Early Cretaceous reptiles of North America
Fossil taxa described in 1991
Fossil taxa described in 1928